Moulton may refer to:

Places in the United Kingdom 
In England
Moulton, Cheshire
Moulton, Lincolnshire
Moulton Windmill
Moulton St Mary, Norfolk
Moulton, Northamptonshire
Moulton College, agricultural college
Moulton Park, industrial estate
Moulton, Suffolk
Moulton Paddocks, racehorse training establishment
Moulton, North Yorkshire
Moulton Hall, 17th-century manor house
In Wales
Moulton, Vale of Glamorgan

Places in the U.S. 
Moulton, Alabama
Moulton, Iowa
Moulton, Ohio
Moulton Township, Auglaize County, Ohio
Moulton, Texas

Places in Antarctica 
Moulton Escarpment
Mount Moulton

Other uses 
William Moulton Marston
Moulton (surname)
Moulton Bicycle
Moulton lunar crater
Moulton plane, a non-desarguesian plane geometry
Moulton (horse), a Thoroughbred racehorse

See also 
Molten (disambiguation)
Molton (disambiguation)